Zelim Imadaev (born January 25, 1995) is a Russian mixed martial artist who competed in the Welterweight division of the Ultimate Fighting Championship.

Background
Imadaev began training in combat sports when he was 14 years old. His first foray was into kickboxing for one year, before pursuing boxing. With boxing, he held an amateur record of 59–1. He was also involved in numerous street fights, which prompted his brother to recommend Imadaev to start training mixed martial arts.

Mixed martial arts career

Early career
Before entering the UFC, Zelim fought in Russian MMA promotions, most notably Fight Nights Global, where he compiled an undefeated 8–0, all won by technical knockout or knockout.

Ultimate Fighting Championship
Imadaev faced Max Griffin in his UFC debut on April 13, 2019, at UFC 236. He lost the fight via majority decision. Imadaev was deducted a point in the first round for grabbing the fence.

Zelim faced Danny Roberts on 9 November at UFC on ESPN+ 21. He lost the fight via knockout in round two.

Imadaev faced Michel Pereira on September 5, 2020, at UFC Fight Night: Overeem vs. Sakai. During the weigh-in ceremony, Imadaev slapped the Brazilian and both fighters were restrained by the event's security. In the fight, Imadaev was dominated throughout and Pereira repeatedly slapped him. Imadaev ultimately was taken down in the third round and lost the fight via submission due to a rear-naked choke.

In October 2020, Imadaev praised a Chechen teen responsible for the decapitation of French schoolteacher Samuel Paty, describing the murderer as a "hero of Islam" on social media. The UFC stated in response that Imadaev had already been "released from his contract earlier this summer and is no longer a member of the promotion’s roster".

Mixed martial arts record

| Loss
| align=center|8–3
| Michel Pereira
|Submission (rear-naked choke)
|UFC Fight Night: Overeem vs. Sakai
|
|align=center|3
|align=center|4:39
|Las Vegas, Nevada, United States
|
|-
| Loss
| align=center|8–2
| Danny Roberts
|KO (punch)
|UFC Fight Night: Magomedsharipov vs. Kattar 
|
|align=center|2
|align=center|4:54
|Moscow, Russia
|
|-
| Loss
| align=center|8–1
| Max Griffin
|Decision (majority)
|UFC 236 
|
|align=center|3
|align=center|5:00
|Atlanta, Georgia, United States
|
|-
| Win
| align=center|8–0
| Ivan Gluhak
| KO (punch)
| Fight Nights Global 85
| 
| align=center|1
| align=center|0:13
| Moscow, Russia
|
|-
| Win
| align=center| 7–0
| Yuri Izotov
| KO (spinning back elbow)
| Fight Nights Global 74
| 
| align=center|1
| align=center|3:17
| Moscow, Russia
| 
|-
| Win
| align=center| 6–0
| Kenan Guliev
| TKO (punches)
| Fight Nights Global 66
|
|align=Center|1
|align=center|1:34
|Makhachkala, Russia
| 
|-
| Win
| align=center| 5–0
| Chorshanbe Chorshanbiev
| TKO (punches)
| OFS 11
| 
| align=center| 3
| align=center| 1:50
| Moscow, Russia
| 
|-
| Win
| align=center| 4–0
| Dmitriy Tuzov
| TKO (punch)
| OFS 10: Heroes Return
| 
| align=center| 2
| align=center| 0:11
| Yaroslavl, Russia
| 
|-
| Win
| align=center| 3–0
| Kamardin Akhmadbekov
| TKO (punch)
| OFS 9: Battle in Abkhazia
| 
| align=center| 1
| align=center| 1:03
| Sukhumi, Russia
| 
|-
| Win
| align=center| 2–0
| Alexander Kovalenko
| TKO (punches)
| GEFC: Hammer of Thor 3
| 
| align=center| 2
| align=center| 3:58
| Shcholkine, Ukraine
|
|-
| Win
| align=center| 1–0
| Stanislav Pavlenko
| KO (punches)
| Dagestan Cage Fighting Championship 2016
| 
| align=center| 1
| align=center| 0:12
| Kaspiysk, Russia
|

Professional boxing record

See also 
 List of male mixed martial artists

References

External links 
 

1995 births
Living people
Russian male mixed martial artists
Welterweight mixed martial artists
Chechen mixed martial artists
Mixed martial artists utilizing boxing
Ultimate Fighting Championship male fighters
Russian male boxers
Sportspeople from Grozny